Shevah Stern (born 23 April 1951) is an Israeli politician. He served as a member of the Knesset for Likud from 2020 to 2021.

Biography
Stern grew up in Safed. During his national service in the Israel Defence Forces, he served in the 50th battalion of the Nahal Brigade. He subsequently earned a bachelor's degree in physics from Bar-Ilan University. One of the founders of the West Bank settlement movement, he moved to the settlement of Shilo when it was founded in 1978. He also served as a director of the Amana settlement movement. He worked as the manager of a software companies he owns.

He joined Likud and became a member of its party centre. Prior to the 2015 Knesset elections he was given the thirty-eighth place on the Likud list, but failed to win a seat. He was placed thirty-eighth on the Likud list for the April 2019 elections, but the party won only 35 seats. He was placed forty-first for the September 2019 elections, in which Likud won 32 seats. Although he missed out again in the March 2020 elections in which he was placed forty-first and Likud won 36 seats, he entered the Knesset in December 2020 as a replacement for Michal Shir, who had resigned to join Gideon Sa'ar's New Hope party. Placed thirty-eighth on the Likud list for the March 2021 elections, he lost his seat as Likud was reduced to 30 seats.

References

External links

1951 births
Living people
People from Safed
Bar-Ilan University alumni
Israeli settlers
Likud politicians
Members of the 23rd Knesset (2020–2021)